The list of shipwrecks in 1802 includes ships sunk, foundered, wrecked, grounded, or otherwise lost during 1802.

January

1 January

4 January

7 January

8 January

9 January

10 January

11 January

13 January

16 January

17 January

20 January

21 January

22 January

24 January

26 January

27 January

28 January

Unknown date

February

1 February

4 February

5 February

6 February

7 February

8 February

9 February

11 February

12 February

15 February

18 February

20 February

22 February

24 February

25 February

Unknown date

March

2 March

3 March

4 March

9 March

10 March

13 March

14 March

16 March

19 March

20 March

21 March

22 March

23 March

25 March

26 March

28 March

29 March

Unknown date

April

2 April

5 April

7 April

10 April

11 April

12 April

13 April

16 April

20 April

23 April

24 April

25 April

Unknown date

May

10 May

12 May

13 May

14 May

18 May

22 May

23 May

29 May

Unknown date

June

13 June

17 June

18 June

20 June

30 June

Unknown date

July

2 July

4 July

9 July

10 July

12 July

13 July

14 July

15 July

18 July

19 July

21 July

23 July

24 July

Unknown date

August

8 August

13 August

21 August

23 August

25 August

28 August

29 August

31 August

Unknown date

September

4 September

5 September

6 September

10 September

14 September

17 September

20 September

23 September

28 September

29 September

30 September

Unknown date

October

1 October

3 October

4 October

5 October

6 October

9 October

13 October

15 October

19 October

20 October

25 October

26 October

27 October

28 October

29 October

31 October

Unknown date

November

2 November

3 November

4 November

9 November

12 November

13 November

16 November

17 November

18 November

20 November

21 November

22 November

23 November

25 November

26 November

27 November

28 November

Unknown date

December

1 December

2 December

3 December

5 December

7 December

9 December

10 December

12 December

14 December

15 December

16 December

17 December

18 December

20 December

23 December

24 December

25 December

26 December

27 December

28 December

29 December

31 December

Unknown date

Unknown date

References

1802